Paramunnidae is a family of isopods belonging to the order Isopoda.

Genera

Genera:
 Abyssianira Menzies, 1956
 Acutomunna Winkler, 1994
 Advenogonium Just & Wilson, 2007

References

Isopoda
Crustacean families